Kallada is a village in Kollam district of the Indian state of Kerala. Maharaja Marthanda Varma of the kingdom of Travancore was born there. The Kallada River passes through there and the famous Chittumala Sree Durga Devi temple is situated there, Kallada Valiya  pally(St. Mary's orthodox church / mar andhrayos pilgrim centre) is also situated there.

See also 
 Kizhakkekallada

References

Villages in Kollam district